The Irazú Volcano is an active volcano in Costa Rica, situated in the Cordillera Central close to the city of Cartago.

The name could come from either the combination of "ara" (point) and "tzu" (thunder) or a corruption of Iztarú, which was the name of an indigenous village on the flanks of the volcano.  In Costa Rica it is known by the name of "El Coloso" (The Colossus) due to the catastrophes that it has provoked in the past.

The volcano's summit has several craters, one of which contains Diego de la Haya, a green crater lake of variable depth. At 11,260 feet (3,432 m), the Irazú Volcano is the highest active volcano in Costa Rica.   It is easily visited from San José, with a road leading right up to the summit craters and a weekly bus service to the top.  It is thus a popular tourist spot. The summit of the volcano also houses a few television transmitters for television stations in San José.

From the top it is possible to see both the Atlantic and Pacific Oceans  on a clear day. However, such clear days are rare, and the volcano's summit is usually cloud-covered.

The volcano is contained within the Irazú Volcano National Park, which spreads across 5,705 acres (2,300 ha). The national park contains both primary and secondary montane forests and is home to armadillos, owls, rabbits, foxes, woodpeckers, and hummingbirds.

Geology 
The Irazú volcano is a complex volcanic shield. Its five craters are easily differentiated. The most important ones, because of their activity, are The Main Crater and the Diego de la Haya crater. Other craters are Playa Hermosa, La Laguna, and El Piroclastico.

Irazú is the southernmost of the ten Quaternary volcanoes which form a northwest-trending line through central and northern Costa Rica. Radioactive dating has shown an age of at least 854,000 years with eruption peaks at 570,000 years and the most recent active phase from 136,000 years to present. The most recent activity includes lava flows along with strombolian and phreatomagmatic explosions. Lava types include basalt and andesite erupted during different events suggesting the volcano is fed by two distinct magma chambers. Scientists believed that pulses of magma mixed together in the chamber before climbing upward—a process estimated to take several thousands of years. But Columbia University volcanologists found that the eruption of Costa Rica's Irazu volcano in 1963 was likely triggered by magma that took a nonstop route from the mantle over just a few months.  Study authors called it the highway from hell.

Eruptive history

Irazú has erupted frequently in historical times — at least 23 times since its first historically recorded  eruption in 1723.  Its most famous eruption began in mid-March 1963, a few days before US President John F. Kennedy started a state visit to Costa Rica. It showered the capital San José and much of the central highlands of Costa Rica with ash. Eruptions continued for two years.

Its historical eruptions generally have VEIs of 1 to 3. All historical eruptions have been explosive, and there have been many phreatic eruptions, and some have produced pyroclastic flows. The latest eruption lasted only 1 day, and occurred on December 8, 1994. It occurred at a flank vent and was a phreatic eruption, which produced lahars.

Climate

Gallery

See also

 List of volcanoes in Costa Rica
 Irazú Volcano National Park

References

External links

 Costa Rican Vulcanologic and Seismologic Observatory: Irazú 
 Virtual Reality Panorama of Volcán Irazú
 Costa Rica Volcanoes and Volcanics, USGS
 Parque Nacional Volcán Irazú (in Spanish)

Subduction volcanoes
Active volcanoes
Stratovolcanoes of Costa Rica
Mountains of Costa Rica
Volcanic crater lakes
Geography of Cartago Province
Pleistocene stratovolcanoes
Holocene stratovolcanoes